The Slovene diaspora include autochthonous Slovene minority in Italy, estimated at 83,000 – 100,000, Slovene minority in southern Austria at 24,855, in Croatia at 13,200, and Slovene minority in Hungary at 3,180 and a significant Slovene expatriate communities live in the United States (most notably Greater Cleveland, home to the highest concentration outside Europe with estimated between 50,000 - 80,000, and largest number of Slovene speakers in the country). And in other European countries, in Argentina, Brazil, Venezuela, Australia, Canada and the United Kingdom.

References

External links

 
European diasporas